Cartaya is a surname. Notable people with the surname include:

Guillermo Hernández-Cartaya (born 1932), Cuban banker
Loanny Cartaya (born 1985), Cuban footballer
Reinier Cartaya (born 1981), Cuban cyclist